Gnomonia nerviseda is a fungal plant pathogen. It has been found to cause vein spot disease in pecan trees.

References

Gnomoniaceae
Fungal tree pathogens and diseases
Nut tree diseases
Fungi described in 1933